Dowband may refer to:
 Dowband-e Cheshmeh Puti
 Dowband-e Shahniz